Dr (later Sir) Pendrill Charles Varrier-Jones (24 February 1883 – 30 January 1941) was a Welsh-born physician who created Papworth Village Settlement, an industrial colony for the treatment and rehabilitation of tuberculosis patients. From 1948, the treatment blocks of the settlement were passed to the National Health Service to become Papworth Hospital and the charitable foundation later became the Papworth Trust.

Published works
Incomplete
 Varrier-Jones, Pendrill C., with a preface by G. Sims Woodhead (1916). Tuberculosis and the Working Man: An Appeal to Friendly Societies. Cambridge: W. Heffer 
 Woodhead, G. Sims & Varrier-Jones, Pendrill; with preface by Sir Clifford Allbutt (1920). Industrial Colonies and Village Settlements for the Consumptive. Cambridge: Cambridge University Press   Book available online

References

External links
Sir Pendrill Charles Varrier-Jones in Oxford Dictionary of National Biography
"Papworth Village Settlement--a unique experiment in the treatment and care of the tuberculous?," Linda Bryder, Medical History, 1984 Oct; 28 (4): pp. 372–90

20th-century Welsh medical doctors
1883 births
1941 deaths